Jürgen Koffler (born 7 May 1960) is a German sprinter. He competed in the men's 4 × 100 metres relay at the 1984 Summer Olympics representing West Germany.

References

1960 births
Living people
Athletes (track and field) at the 1984 Summer Olympics
German male sprinters
Olympic athletes of West Germany
Place of birth missing (living people)